Mortagne may refer to:

Mortagne (river), a river in northeastern France
places in France:
Mortagne, Vosges, in the Vosges department
Mortagne-au-Perche, in the Orne department
Mortagne-du-Nord, in the Nord department
Mortagne-sur-Gironde, in the Charente-Maritime department
Mortagne-sur-Sèvre, in the Vendée department
Bec-de-Mortagne, in the Seine-Maritime department